Ljiljana Nanušević (born 2 August 1981) is a Serbian former professional tennis player who played in the Fed Cup for Yugoslavia.

Nanušević made all of her Fed Cup appearances in the 1997 Fed Cup, while aged only 15. Playing in a total of five ties, she played doubles in each of them, as well as singles once, managing to win every rubber.

She won an ITF singles tournament in Istanbul in 2001 and won a further two ITF titles in doubles.

ITF finals

Singles: 2 (1–1)

Doubles: 11 (2–9)

References

External links
 
 
 

1981 births
Living people
Serbian female tennis players
Serbia and Montenegro female tennis players